Boatswain Bay is an uninhabited waterway in the Qikiqtaaluk Region of Nunavut, Canada. It extends eastward from James Bay into the headland, a part of Quebec.

Geography

Fauna

Boatswain Bay has been designated as a migratory bird sanctuary, a Canadian Important Bird Area (#NU097), a Biodiversity Reserve, and a Key Migratory Bird Terrestrial Habitat site.

References

James Bay
Important Bird Areas of Qikiqtaaluk Region